Yellow sun or Yellow Sun may refer to:

Yellow Sun (nuclear weapon), a British nuclear weapon
Yellow sun, a type of stellar classification
"Yellow Sun", a song by The Raconteurs from their album Broken Boy Soldiers